Gourlayia regia is a species of beetle in the family Carabidae, the only species in the genus Gourlayia.

References

Pterostichinae